Nailbiter is a 2013 horror film directed by Patrick Rea. The movie was first released onto DVD in Japan on January 25, 2013 and received its American debut on April 5, 2013 at the Phoenix Film Festival. It stars Erin McGrane as a mother who defends herself and her children against a dangerous foe. Rea intends to film a sequel to the film, which is tentatively titled Nailbiter: The Storm Children and will feature Meg Saricks reprising her role as Jennifer.

Plot
Janet and her children Sally, Jennifer, and Alice are on the way to the airport to pick up their military father when they are forced to take shelter from a tornado that is ravaging the area. They manage to find a storm cellar outside of a seemingly abandoned house, however once the storm stops they discover that a fallen tree is preventing them from leaving. Sally decides to try escaping from a window, only to get bitten by something outside of the cellar and fall into temporary unconsciousness. Attempts by Jennifer to message her father for help are unsuccessful.

Their car is noticed by the local deputy Carr, who begins to search for the family. He asks a neighbor, Mrs. Shurman, only for her to claim ignorance of the Maguires. Carr continues to look and finds the family, but is killed in the process by an unseen monster. Frantic, the family searches the cellar for any chance of escape and in turn finds a diary that reveals that the Shuman family will give birth to monsters whenever they go into labor during a storm.

They manage to also find a hidden tunnel leading to a moonshine distillery. Janet and Jennifer investigate the distillery and take a propane tank. While they are gone, a monster invades the cellar and takes Alice away.  Janet manages to open the door using the propane tank as a bomb, but dies in the process. Sally and Jennifer escape the cellar but make it to a neighboring home, only to find that they are monsters similar to the Shurmans. Sally is attacked by the family, leaving only Jennifer to escape. She is soon surrounded by a large group of people, all of whom are monsters that begin to transform as a storm approaches. Jennifer is then attacked. The following morning there is no trace of Jennifer except the series of text messages that she had sent to her father throughout the film.

Cast
Erin McGrane as Janet Maguire
Meg Saricks as Jennifer Maguire
Emily Boresow as Alice Maguire
Sally Spurgeon as Sally Maguire
Joicie Appell as Mrs. Shurman
Mark Ridgway as Sheriff
Ben Jeffrey as Deputy Carr
Michelle Davidson as Dina
Allen Lowman as Tom
Ian Dempsey as Sean
Aaron Laue as Lt. Maguire
Zane Martin as Little monster
John D. Barnes as Townsperson
Jason Coffman as Creature
Tom Conroy as Bartender
Anita Cordell as Traveler at airport

Production
Rea first announced plans for Nailbiter in 2008 but did not begin production until 2009, as he had to first raise funding for the film. Filming began in 2009 in Kansas City, Missouri, but shooting stopped 2/3 of the way into the film as Rea ran out of funding. The cast and crew resumed filming in December 2010 and shot an additional airport scene in May 2011, after which point they moved fully into post production. While working on the film's script, Rea chose to make much of the cast female as he "felt like that would be more endearing as well as more compelling." Before officially beginning filming, Rea had his four main actors "go out and act like a family for awhile" in order to build a connection between the actors. Other than financial difficulties, the only significant issue with the filming for Nailbiter experienced was the weather, as the "days [Rea] wanted to look stormy were sunny and the days [he] wanted to look sunny looked stormy".

Reception

Critical reception for Nailbiter has been mixed to positive. A reviewer for Star Pulse commented that "As far as sheer creep factor, "Nailbiter" delivers handsomely" but criticized the DVD's lack of a "making of" documentary. The Oklahoma Gazette praised the film's setting, as they felt that this was "intriguing" and also commented favorably on the choice of making Erin McGrane's character an alcoholic. Ain't It Cool News also cited McGrane's character's alcoholism as a highlight, as they saw this as one of several small touches that they enjoyed. Dread Central remarked that the film was "not a perfect flick", as they felt that McGrane took too long to settle into her character but overall saw the movie as "ingenious, creepy and a delightful modern take on an old-school sense of storytelling".

Awards
Best Director at Fright Night Film Fest (2013, won)
Best Horror Feature at Shriekfest (2013, won)

References

External links
 
 

2013 films
2013 horror films
2010s monster movies
American monster movies
Films about families
Films shot in Missouri
2010s English-language films
2010s American films